Thorsell is a Swedish surname. Notable people with the surname include:

 Björn Thorsell (born 1964), Swedish ice hockey player
 Elisabeth Thorsell (born 1945), Swedish writer and professional genealogist
 Eric Thorsell (1898–1980)
 Johan Thorsell (born 1974), Swedish singer
 Staffan Thorsell (born 1943), Swedish journalist and author
 Walborg Thorsell (1919–2016), Swedish scientist
 William Thorsell (born 1945), Canadian journalist

Swedish-language surnames